The 2022 GB Pro-Series Shrewsbury was a professional tennis tournament played on indoor hard courts. It was the thirteenth edition of the tournament which was part of the 2022 ITF Women's World Tennis Tour. It took place in Shrewsbury, United Kingdom between 31 October and 6 November 2022.

Champions

Singles

  Markéta Vondroušová def.  Eva Lys, 7–5, 6–2.

Doubles

  Miriam Kolodziejová /  Markéta Vondroušová def.  Jessika Ponchet /  Renata Voráčová, 7–6(7–4), 6–2.

Singles main draw entrants

Seeds

 1 Rankings are as of 24 October 2022.

Other entrants
The following players received wildcards into the singles main draw:
  Emily Appleton
  Amarni Banks
  Yuriko Miyazaki
  Eden Silva

The following player received entry into the singles main draw using a junior exempt:
  Petra Marčinko

The following players received entry from the qualifying draw:
  Freya Christie
  Joanna Garland
  Gabriela Knutson
  Maia Lumsden
  Eliz Maloney
  Ella McDonald
  Barbora Palicová
  Yanina Wickmayer

References

External links
 2022 GB Pro-Series Shrewsbury at ITFtennis.com
 Official website

2022 ITF Women's World Tennis Tour
2022 in English tennis
October 2022 sports events in the United Kingdom
November 2022 sports events in the United Kingdom